Lucy is an English feminine given name derived from the Latin masculine given name Lucius with the meaning as of light (born at dawn or daylight, maybe also shiny, or of light complexion). Alternative spellings are Luci, Luce, Lucie, Lucia, and Luzia.

The English Lucy surname is taken from the Norman language that was Latin-based and derives from place names in Normandy based on Latin male personal name Lucius. It was transmitted to England after the Norman Conquest in the 11th century (see also De Lucy).

Feminine name variants

Luiseach (Irish)
Lusine, Լուսինե, Լուսինէ (Armenian)
Lučija, Лучија (Serbian)
Lucy, Люси (Bulgarian)
Lutsi, Луци  (Macedonian)
Lutsija, Луција  (Macedonian)
Liùsaidh (Scottish Gaelic)
Liucija (Lithuanian)
Liucilė (Lithuanian)
Lūcija, Lūsija (Latvian)
Lleucu (Welsh)
Llúcia (Catalan)
Loukia, Λουκία (Greek)
Luca (Hungarian)
Luce (French, Italian)
Lucetta (English)
Lucette (French)
Lúcia (Portuguese)
Lucía (Spanish)
Lucia  (Danish, English, Finnish, German, Italian, Norwegian, Romanian, Slovak, Swedish)
Luciana (Italian, Portuguese, Romanian, Spanish)
Lucie (French, Czech)
Luciella (Italian)
Lucienne (French)
Lucija (Croatian, Slovene)
Lucila (Spanish)
Lucilla (Italian)
Lucille (English, French)
Lucinda (English, Portuguese)
Lucinde (French)
Lucita (Spanish)
Łucja (Polish)
Lucy (English)
Lucyna (Polish)
Luz (Spanish)
Luzi (German)
Luzia (German, Portuguese)
Luzie (German). 
Liosibhe (Irish)
Λουκία (Greek)

People (and other primates)

 Lucy (Australopithecus) (c. 3,000,000 BCE), fossil also known as AL 288-1
 Lucy (chimpanzee), well-known case of a chimpanzee raised as a human
 Saint Lucy (283–304), Christian saint and martyr
 Lucy Morris Chaffee Alden (1836–1912), American author, educator, hymnwriter 	
 Lucy Alexander (born 1971), English television presenter
 Lucy Atkinson (1817–1893), British explorer
 Lucille Ball (1911–1989), American actress and comedian remembered for her character "Lucy"
 Lucy Barnes (1780–1809), American writer
 Lucy Boynton (born 1994), English and American actress
 Lucy Ann Brooks (1835-1926), English temperance advocate
 Lucy Bronze (born 1991), English footballer
 Lucy Burns (1879–1966), American suffragist and women's rights advocate
 Lucy Wood Butler (1820-1895), American temperance leader
 Lucy Collett (born 1989), British glamour model 
 Lucy DeCoutere (born 1970), actress, best known for playing "Lucy" on the Trailer Park Boys
 Lucy Clementina Davies (1795–1879), British writer
 Lucy Davis (born 1973), English actress
 Lucy Davis (born 1992), American equestrian
 Lucy Salisbury Doolittle (1832-1908), American philanthropist
 Lucy Durack (born 1982), Australian actress and singer
 Lucy Fallon (born 1995), British actress
 Lucy Faust, American actress
 Lucy Fisher (born 1949), American film producer
 Lucy Fleming (born 1947), British actress 
 Lucy Nettie Fletcher (1886-1918), nurse
 Lucy Flores (born 1979), American politician
 Lucy Frazer (born 1972), British politician
 Lucy Virginia French (1825–1881), American author 
 Lucy Fry (born 1992), Australian actress
 Lucy Furr (born 1975), American professional wrestler
 Lucy Gunning (born 1964), English filmmaker, installation artist, sculptor, video artist and lecturer
 Lucy Hale (born 1989), American actress
 Lucy M. Hall (1843–1907), American physician, writer 	
 Lucy Hawking (born 1970), English journalist, novelist, educator, and philanthropist
 Lucy Hayes (1831–1889), First Lady of the United States 
 Lucy Hockings, New Zealand born television presenter on BBC World News
 Lucy Hooper (1816–1841), 19th-century American poet
 Lucy Hamilton Hooper (1835–1893), American poet, journalist, editor, playwright 	
 Lucy Jones (born 1955), American seismologist
 Lucy Lameck (1934–1992), Tanzanian politician
 Lucy Stedman Lamson (1857-1926), American business woman, educator
 Lucy Larcom (1824–1893), American teacher, poet, author 
 Lucy de László (1870–1950), Irish musician and socialite
 Lucy Lawless (born 1968), New Zealand actress and singer
 Lucy Liu (born 1968), American actress
 Lucy A. Mallory (1846–1920), American writer, publisher, newspaper editor, spiritualist 	
 Lucy Martin (born 1990), British professional road and track cyclist
 Lucy Mecklenburgh (born 1991), English actress and entrepreneur
 Lucy Montgomery (born 1975), British voice actress
 Lucy Mvubelo (1920–2000), South African trade unionist
 Lucy Parham (born 1966), British concert pianist
 Lucy Parsons (1853–1942), American labor organizer, radical socialist and anarchist communist
 Lucy Partington (1952–1974), British murder victim
 Lucy Pinder (born 1983), English glamour model and actress
 Lucy Punch (born 1977), English actress
 Lucy Speed (born 1976), English actress
 Lucy Qinnuayuak (1915–1982), Inuit Canadian artist
 Lucy Simon (1940–2022), American composer for the theatre and of popular songs
 Lucy Stone (1818–1893), American activist
 Lucy Hobbs Taylor (1833–1910), American dentist and teacher
 Lucy Temerlin (1964–1987), a chimpanzee known for her use of American Sign Language
 Lucy Torres-Gomez (b.1974), Filipino actress and politician
 Lucy Turnbull (born 1958), Australian businesswoman, philanthropist, former local government politician, and former First Lady of Australia
 Lucy Verasamy (b. 1980), British weather forecaster 
 Lucy Hall Washington (1835–1913), American poet, social reformer 	
 Lucy Wheelock (1857–1946), American educator, writer
 Lucy Worsley (born 1973), English historian

Fictional characters

 Lucy, portrayed by Mouni Roy from film K.G.F: Chapter 1
 Lucy, a character in the webtoon series Adventures of God
 Lucy; a character on Trailer Park Boys
 Titular protagonist of the 2014 sci-fi/action film Lucy
 Lucy/Nyu in the manga Elfen Lied
 Lucy Barker in Stephen Sondheim's Sweeney Todd: The Demon Barber of Fleet Street
 Lucy Ashton, the female protagonist in Sir Walter Scott’s ‘’The Bride of Lammermoor’’
 Lucy Beale in the British soap opera EastEnders
 Lucy Camden-Kinkirk in the TV series 7th Heaven
 Lucy Carlyle, main character in the Lockwood and Co. series by Jonathan Stroud
 Lucy Coe in General Hospital
 Lucy Cunningham-Schultz in the radio drama Adventures in Odyssey
 Lucy Dennison in Richie Tankersley Cusick's books series The Unseen
 Lucy Fernandez in the Degrassi series
 Lucy Fields in the television series Grey's Anatomy
 Lucy Gray, a character in The Ballad of Songbirds and Snakes by Suzanne Collins
 Lucy Harris in Frank Wildhorn's Jekyll & Hyde
 Lucy Heartfilia, the main female protagonist of the manga and anime series Fairy Tail
 Lucy Honeychurch, the protagonist of A Room with a View and its film adaptations
 Eponymous character in the song "Lucy in the Sky with Diamonds" by the Beatles, said to be based on a drawing of Lucy O'Donnell or the LSD abbreviation
 Lucy and the Diamonds, antagonists in the film Sgt. Pepper's Lonely Hearts Club Band based around the song
 Lucy Carrigan, a main character in the film Across the Universe based loosely around the song
 Lucy the Diamond Fairy, a character in the Rainbow Magic book franchise named after the song
 Lucy Knight in the TV series ER
 Lucy Lane, sister of Superman's girlfriend Lois Lane
 Lucy Loud, in the TV series The Loud House
 Lucy Maria Misora, an alien character in the Japanese adult visual novel ToHeart2
 Lucy Mills, a main character in ABC's Once Upon a Time
 Lucy Muir, in The Ghost and Mrs. Muir
 Lucy Pevensie in the Chronicles of Narnia book series and the film series adaptation
Lucy Preston, a main character in the 2016 show Timeless
 Lucy Quinn Fabray, in TV series Glee
 Lucy Ricardo, the star character of I Love Lucy
 Lucy Robinson, in the Australian television soap opera Neighbours
 Lucy Romalotti in the American soap opera The Young and the Restless
 Lucy Saxon, the Master's ex-wife from the third series and 2008–2010 specials of the Doctor Who revival series
 Lucy Simian, a character from The Amazing World of Gumball
 Lucy Snowe, heroine of Villette by Charlotte Brontë
 Lucy Steel, a major character in the 7th part of JoJo's Bizarre Adventure,Steel Ball Run
 Lucy Steele, in Sense and Sensibility and its various adaptations
 Lucy Stillman, recurring character in Assassin's Creed
 Lucy Tartan, a major character in Herman Melville's novel Pierre: or, The Ambiguities
 Lucy van Pelt, in Charles Schulz’s comic strip Peanuts and related franchise
 Lucy Westenra in Dracula and its various adaptations
 Lucy Whitmore, main character in the 2004 film 50 First Dates
 Lucy Wilde, in Despicable Me 2 and Despicable Me 3
 Wyldstyle, or Lucy, in the film The Lego Movie
 Lucy Emerson, a character from the film The Lost Boys
 Lucyna Kushinada, more commonly called Lucy, a major character in Cyberpunk: Edgerunners

See also
 Luci
 Lusi (disambiguation)
 Lucie
 Lucey
 Lucia (disambiguation)
 the star BPM 37093, nicknamed "Lucy"
 Lucy the elephant, tourist attraction in Margate, New Jersey, United States
 Lucy (spacecraft)

 
English feminine given names
Latin feminine given names